Armand Dubois Yankep (born 17 December 1985 in Yaoundé) is a former Cameroonian footballer. He played as a midfielder, finishing his career in late 2016 after a stint at NK Ivančna Gorica.

Yankep joined Inter in July 2008 from NK Vinogradar, and before that he played for FK Rabotnički in the Macedonian First League.

In some sources his surname is spelled Jankep.

Following three seasons playing for fourth-tier Savski Marof in Croatia, Yankep moved in the summer of 2016 to third-tier Slovenian side NK Ivančna Gorica where he played until the end of 2016.

References

1985 births
Living people
Footballers from Yaoundé
Cameroonian footballers
Cameroonian expatriate footballers
FK Rabotnički players
Expatriate footballers in North Macedonia
NK Inter Zaprešić players
NK Vinogradar players
Croatian Football League players
Expatriate footballers in Croatia
Association football midfielders
Cameroonian expatriate sportspeople in Croatia